KWDM, "88.7 KWDM The Point," is a modern rock high school radio station serving the Des Moines, Iowa area on 88.7 FM.  The radio station's studio is located at Valley High School in West Des Moines. It is owned and operated by the West Des Moines Community School District and is operated by students at Valley under the direction of a staff advisor.

History

On October 1, 1976, the West Des Moines Community School District signed KWDM on the air at 88.9 MHz. The KWDM call letters had previously been used on two commercial stations in Des Moines, 1150 AM (now KWKY) and 93.3 FM (now KIOA), under the ownership of George Webber.
In 1994, KWDM's frequency was migrated from 88.9 FM to 88.7 FM and its power increased from 10 watts ERP to 100 watts. The station is one of two high school radio stations in Iowa, the other being KDPS operated by Des Moines Public Schools.

Programming
KWDM's student staff dictate what format the station will play.  Students have the option to change the format at the beginning of any school year.  In the late 1970s and through much of the 1980s, the station played a free-form format where the on-air jock played the music of their choice.  In the early 1990s, the station was a strictly classic rock format.  In 1993, the station began playing the popular Alternative or Modern Rock format.  In 1999, KWDM began to experiment with a switch to CHR/Top 40 music.  The move was abandoned after IHeartMedia, Inc. owned KKDM switched formats from Alternative to Top 40.  The station continues to play the Modern Rock format today.

Student management
One of KWDM's hallmarks is its student management. While a faculty advisor oversees operations and is responsible for regulatory and engineering issues, students are predominantly responsible for the station's programming and music selection. One student (In most cases) is selected each year through a competitive application process to serve as station manager.

KWDM alums in broadcasting
In the more than 30 years that the West Des Moines School District has owned KWDM, many of the station's alumni have gone on to careers in the radio and television industry.

Current Shows and Information
Current broadcasts expected to change due to seniors leaving.

The Morning Show: News, Weather, Traffic and a great way to start any morning on the way to work or school.

The Mankle in the Morning Show: Daily sit down with the station manager Taylor Mankle full of interactive fan requests and music.

The Spread: A Variety Show of sorts as prominent voices of the point shine through in a more musical light as improve song are made on the spot along with covers for the enjoyment of listeners. Lead by Taylor Mankle, along with Jacob White, Henry Parizek, and Nick Cesario.

Tiger Talk: A group discussion before every Valley Football game with guest callers, predictions, stats and much more. Lead by Jack Rodgers, Jeff Goetz, Jake Goetz, Logan Bylie, and Ben Swanson.

Football Games: Most VHS football games are broadcast live on air with play-by-play announcer Taylor Mankle and color announcers Nick Cesario and Ben Swanson.

Basketball Games: All VHS basketball home games are broadcast live by play-by-play announcer Taylor Mankle.

Half Time Show: If booked, local bands perform live in the studio for both football and basketball half time shows.

References

 KWDM FM 93.3. Accessed July 9, 2006.
 West Des Moines Community School District Home. Accessed July 9, 2006.

External links
  KWDM The Point website

WDM